Gerard Nicolas Giraldo Villa (born 21 March 1989) is a Colombian athlete competing in middle-distance and long distance running events. He specialises in the 3000 metres steeplechase. He competed at the 2015 World Championships.

At the 2015 South American Championships he won the steeplechase in a championship record time of 8:29.53 minutes and also set a Colombian record of 3:42.38 minutes for the 1500 metres, winning a bronze medal. He was the silver medallist in the steeplechase at the 2014 South American Games behind José Peña.

Competition record

Personal bests

References

External links
 

1989 births
Living people
Colombian male middle-distance runners
Colombian male long-distance runners
Colombian male steeplechase runners
Athletes (track and field) at the 2016 Summer Olympics
Olympic athletes of Colombia
Athletes (track and field) at the 2018 South American Games
South American Games medalists in athletics
South American Games silver medalists for Colombia
Central American and Caribbean Games gold medalists for Colombia
Competitors at the 2014 Central American and Caribbean Games
Competitors at the 2018 Central American and Caribbean Games
Central American and Caribbean Games medalists in athletics
Athletes (track and field) at the 2015 Pan American Games
Pan American Games competitors for Colombia
People from Armenia, Colombia
20th-century Colombian people
21st-century Colombian people